This is a list of flights made in the Bell X-1E airplane.

X-1E pilots

X-1E flights

See also
 Bell X-1
 John B. McKay
 Joseph A. Walker

Flight lists